Streptomyces olivaceoviridis is a bacterium species from the genus of Streptomyces which has been isolated from soil. Streptomyces olivaceoviridis produces chitinase and xylanase.

Further reading

See also 
 List of Streptomyces species

References

External links
Type strain of Streptomyces olivaceoviridis at BacDive -  the Bacterial Diversity Metadatabase	

olivaceoviridis
Bacteria described in 1958